Memorandum Recordings is an Australian record label dedicated to conserving and archiving important Australian sounds from the brink. It is the inhouse archival imprint for Sydney Distributor, Reverberbation, and reflects the director's keen interest in Australia's rich (and often overlooked) musical past. 
 
Future releases include remastered compilations for Lubricated Goat and The Moodists.

List of releases

See also

 List of record labels

References

External links 

  Memorandum Recordings My Space
  Tactics My Space
  Toys Went Berserk My Space

Australian record labels
Reissue record labels
Record labels based in Sydney